Eric J. Guignard (born December 20, 1975 in Montebello, California) is an American horror, dark fantasy, and literary fiction anthologist, editor, and author. He is a lifelong resident of Southern California, and teaches Technical Writing through the University of California system.

Career

As an author 
Eric J. Guignard has written and published over one hundred short stories including "Experiments in An Isolation Tank," published in the 2012 anthology titled Chiral Mad by Written Backwards.; "The Tall Man," published in Shock Totem.; and "A Case Study in Natural Selection and How it Applies to Love," published in Black Static. His non-fiction works include "The H Word: Horror Fiction of Tomorrow," published in Nightmare Magazine.

As an editor 
In 2017, he purchased the small press company Dark Moon Books. Under this imprint, he has released several anthologies including A World of Horror and After Death... which won a Bram Stoker Award for Best Anthology.

The press also published a series of introductory primers titled Exploring Dark Short Fiction: A Primer to.... Each release in this series promotes a specific author, including Steve Rasnic Tem (2017), Kaaron Warren (2018), Nisi Shawl (2018), and Jeffrey Ford (2019).

Guignard is the co-general editor (along with Leslie S. Klinger) of The Haunted Library, which reissues classics of the horror genre, published by the Horror Writers Association and Poisoned Pen Press, an imprint of Sourcebooks.

Awards

Bram Stoker Awards

Other honors

Selected Bibliography

Author

Novels and novellas 
Doorways to the Deadeye (2019, JournalStone) (novel) – 
Baggage of Eternal Night (2013, JournalStone) (novella) –

Collections 
That Which Grows Wild: 16 Tales of Dark Fiction (2018, Cemetery Dance) – 
“A Case Study in Natural Selection and How It Applies to Love”
“Dreams of a Little Suicide"
“The Inveterate Establishment of Daddano & Co."
"A Journey of Great Waves"
"The House of the Rising Sun, Forever"
"Last Days of the Gunslinger, John Amos"

Anthologies edited 
All anthologies below are published under Dark Moon unless otherwise noted.

Exploring Dark Short Fiction 

 Exploring Dark Short Fiction #1: A Primer to Steve Rasnic Tem (2017)
 Exploring Dark Short Fiction #2: A Primer to Kaaron Warren (2018)
Exploring Dark Short Fiction #3: A Primer to Nisi Shawl (2018)
Exploring Dark Short Fiction #4: A Primer to Jeffrey Ford (2019)

Horror Library 

 Horror Library Volume 6 (2017, Cutting Block Books) (republished 2021 under Dark Moon)
 Horror Library Volume 7 (2022)

Standalone 
Dark Tales of Lost Civilizations (2012)
After Death… (2013)
The Five Senses of Horror (2018)
A World of Horror (2018)
Pop the Clutch: Thrilling Tales of Rockabilly, Monsters, and Hot Rod Horror (2019)
Professor Charlatan Bardot's Travel Anthology to the Most (Fictional) Haunted Buildings in the Weird, Wild World (2021)

See also
List of horror fiction authors

References

External links
 EricJGuignard.com - Official site
 Goodreads Author Page
 Internet Speculative Fiction Database entry

1975 births
Living people
American book editors
American online publication editors
American speculative fiction editors
20th-century American novelists
21st-century American novelists
American horror writers
American thriller writers
20th-century American short story writers
21st-century American short story writers
Novelists from California
California State University, Northridge alumni
People from Montebello, California